Hikari is the second full-length album by British metalcore band Oceans Ate Alaska, released on 28 July 2017 through Fearless Records. It is the only album to feature Jake Noakes who replaced the original vocalist James Harrison, after the latter's departure in late 2016.

Track listing

Personnel 

Oceans Ate Alaska
 Jake Noakes – lead vocals
 Adam Zytkiewicz – lead guitar, backing vocals
 James "Jibs" Kennedy – rhythm guitar, backing vocals
 Chris Turner – drums, percussions, engineering
 Mike Stanton – bass guitar

Additional musicians
 Alex Teyen (Black Tongue) - guest vocals on "Benzaiten", guest writing
 Josh Manuel (Issues) - drums on "Ukiyo", guest writing

Production
 Nick Sampson – production, engineering, mixing, mastering, guest writing
 Mike McLafferty, Clem Cherry and Tyler Riley - guest writing

Management
 Jason Mageau (Royal Division Management) - management
 Eric Powell (Spotlight Touring) - world booking excluding Europe/UK
 Maarten Janssen (Loud Noise) - Europe/UK booking
 Cody Demavivas (Fearless Records) - A&R
 Kristin Biskup (Fearless Records) - project management

Artwork
 Karl Pfeiffer - photography
 Florian Mihr - art direction, layout design

References 

2017 albums
Oceans Ate Alaska albums